Lake Quivira  is a city in Johnson and Wyandotte counties in the State of Kansas, and part of the Kansas City Metropolitan Area.  As of the 2020 census, the population of the city was 1,014.

History
Lake Quivira had its start in the 1920s when the developer Charles E. Gault and others set out to construct a subdivision on an artificial lake.

Geography
Lake Quivira is located at  (39.042371, −94.769810).

Demographics

2010 census
As of the census of 2010, there were 906 people, 365 households, and 304 families living in the city. The racial makeup of the city was 96.4% White, 0.6% African American, 0.7% Native American, 0.8% Asian, 0.8% from other races, and 0.9% from two or more races. Hispanic or Latino of any race were 1.8% of the population.

There were 365 households, of which 27.4% had children under the age of 18 living with them, 80.5% were married couples living together, 1.9% had a female householder with no husband present, 0.8% had a male householder with no wife present, and 16.7% were non-families. 13.4% of all households were made up of individuals, and 7.9% had someone living alone who was 65 years of age or older. The average household size was 2.48 and the average family size was 2.73.

The median age in the city was 52.9 years. 21.3% of residents were under the age of 18; 3.2% were between the ages of 18 and 24; 11.8% were from 25 to 44; 37.7% were from 45 to 64; and 26.2% were 65 years of age or older. The gender makeup of the city was 51.4% male and 48.6% female.

2000 census
As of the census of 2000, there were 932 people, 381 households, and 326 families living in the city. The racial makeup of the city was 97.10% White, 0.86% African American, 0.54% Asian, and 1.50% from two or more races. Hispanic or Latino of any race were 2.04% of the population. 26.3% were of English, 24.2% German, 9.7% Irish and 8.3% American ancestry according to Census 2000.

There were 381 households, out of which 24.7% had children under the age of 18 living with them, 81.4% were married couples living together, 2.6% had a female householder with no husband present, and 14.4% were non-families. 11.5% of all households were made up of individuals, and 6.6% had someone living alone who was 65 years of age or older. The average household size was 2.45 and the average family size was 2.65.

In the city, the population was spread out, with 19.1% under the age of 18, 1.8% from 18 to 24, 17.0% from 25 to 44, 42.0% from 45 to 64, and 20.2% who were 65 years of age or older. The median age was 53 years. For every 100 females, there were 104.4 males. For every 100 females age 18 and over, there were 97.9 males.

The median income for a household in the city was $111,670, and the median income for a family was $119,186. Males had a median income of $100,000 versus $45,313 for females. The per capita income for the city was $60,567. About 0.9% of families and 1.3% of the population were below the poverty line, including none of those under the age of eighteen or sixty-five or over.

References

Further reading

External links

 City of Lake Quivira
 Lake Quivira – Directory of Public Officials
 Lake Quivira city map, KDOT

Cities in Kansas
Cities in Wyandotte County, Kansas
Cities in Johnson County, Kansas
Kansas City metropolitan area